Gleydson is a given name. It may refer to:

 Gleydson Carvalho (1982–2015), Brazilian radio show host
 Gleydson (footballer) (born 1989), Gleydson de Oliveira Santos, Brazilian footballer

See also
 Gleidson (disambiguation)
 Glaydson